This article covers the chronology of the 2009 novel influenza A (H1N1) pandemic. Flag icons denote the first announcements of confirmed cases by the respective nation-states, their first deaths (and other major events such as their first intergenerational cases, cases of zoonosis, and the start of national vaccination campaigns), and relevant sessions and announcements of the World Health Organization (WHO), the European Union (and its agency the European Centre for Disease Prevention and Control),
and the U.S. Centers for Disease Control (CDC).

Unless otherwise noted, references to terms like S-OIV, H1N1 and such, all refer to this new A(H1N1) strain and not to sundry other strains of H1N1 which are endemic in humans, birds and pigs.

Summary

See also
2009 flu deaths by region

References

timeline
Health-related lists
Lists by country